Rawalpindi Cantonment is a large cantonment located in Rawalpindi, Punjab province, Pakistan. The headquarters of the Pakistan Army which are known as the General Headquarters (GHQ) are located in the Rawalpindi cantonment.

Rawalpindi cantonment is part of Rawalpindi Metropolitan city Population 3,461,806(2017)
It is situated on the Grand Trunk Road on Railway Line 1, the main railroad of the country. The town has its own railway station Rawalpindi Railway Station. 
Initially, Rawalpindi cantonment was the only one in Rawalpindi city and the largest in Pakistan. However, this was one of the most poorly managed cantonments and it was facing administrative challenges due to its size, area and population. Therefore, during General Pervez Musharraf's era, Rawalpindi cantt. was split into Rawalpindi Cantonment and Chaklala Cantonment. The northern and eastern parts of the city around the airport were included in Chaklala cantt, while the western and southern parts of Rawalpindi cantonment remained as is.

References

 
Cantonments of Pakistan